This is a list of diseases starting with the letter "D".

D
 D ercole syndrome

Da
 Daentl Towsend Siegel syndrome
 Dahlberg Borer Newcomer syndrome
 Daish–Hardman–Lamont syndrome
 Dandy–Walker facial hemangioma
 Dandy–Walker malformation postaxial polydactyly
 Dandy–Walker syndrome recessive form
 Dandy–Walker malformation with mental retardation, basal ganglia disease, and seizures
 Dandy–Walker malformation with mental retardation, macrocephaly, myopia, and brachytelephalangy
 Dandy–Walker syndrome
 Daneman–Davy–Mancer syndrome
 Darier's disease
 Davenport–Donlan syndrome
 David syndrome
 Davis–Lafer syndrome

De

 De Barsy syndrome
 De Hauwere–Leroy–Adriaenssens syndrome
 DeSanctis–Cacchione syndrome

Dea

Deaf
 Deaf blind hypopigmentation

Deafn
 Deafness

Deafne
Deafness c – Deafness s
 Deafness conductive ptosis skeletal anomalies
 Deafness conductive stapedial ear malformation facial palsy
 Deafness congenital onychodystrophy recessive
 Deafness craniofacial syndrome
 Deafness enamel hypoplasia nail defects
 Deafness epiphyseal dysplasia short stature
 Deafness goiter stippled epiphyses
 Deafness hyperuricemia neurologic ataxia
 Deafness hypogonadism syndrome
 Deafness hypospadias metacarpal and metatarsal syndrome
 Deafness mesenteric diverticula of small bowel neuropathy
 Deafness mixed with perilymphatic Gusher, X-linked
 Deafness nephritis ano rectal malformation
 Deafness neurosensory pituitary dwarfism
 Deafness nonsyndromic, Connexin 26 linked
 Deafness oligodontia syndrome
 Deafness onychodystrophy dominant form
 Deafness peripheral neuropathy arterial disease
 Deafness progressive cataract autosomal dominant
 Deafness skeletal dysplasia lip granuloma
 Deafness symphalangism
Deafness v – Deafness x
 Deafness vitiligo achalasia
 Deafness white hair contractures papillomas
 Deafness X-linked, DFN3
 Deafness, autosomal dominant nonsyndromic sensorineural
 Deafness, isolated, due to mitochondrial transmission
 Deafness, neurosensory nonsyndromic recessive, DFN
 Deafness, X linked, DFN

Deal
 Deal–Barratt–Dillon syndrome

Dec–Del
 Deciduous skin
 Decompensated phoria
 Decompression sickness
 Deep vein thrombosis
 Dabbing Syndrome
 Defect in synthesis of adenosylcobalamin
 Defective apolipoprotein B-100
 Defective expression of HLA class 2
 Degenerative motor system disease
 Degenerative optic myopathy
 Degos disease
 Dehydratase deficiency
 Dejerine–Sottas disease
 Delayed ejaculation
 Delayed membranous cranial ossification
 Delayed sleep phase syndrome
 Delayed speech facial asymmetry strabismus ear lobe creases
 Deletion 6q16 q21
 Delirium
 Delirium tremens
 Delusional disorder
 Delleman–Oorthuys syndrome
 Delta-1-pyrroline-5-carboxylate dehydrogenase deficiency
 Delta-sarcoglycanopathy

Dem–Dep
 Dementia
 Dementia, alcohol
 Dementia progressive lipomembranous polycysta
 Dementia, familial British
 Dementia, frontotemporal
 Dementia, HIV
 Dementia pugilistica
 Dementia, vascular
 Dementia with Lewy bodies
 Demodicidosis
 Demyelinating disease
 Dengue fever
 Dennis–Cohen syndrome
 Dennis–Fairhurst–Moore syndrome
 Dent disease
 Dental aberrations steroid dehydrogenase deficienciency
 Dental caries
 Dental fluorosis
 Dental tissue neoplasm
 Dentatorubral-pallidoluysian atrophy
 Dentin dysplasia sclerotic bones
 Dentin dysplasia, coronal
 Dentin dysplasia, radicular
 Dentinogenesis imperfecta
 Dentophobia
 Dependent personality disorder
 Depersonalization disorder
 Depression (clinical)
 Depressive personality disorder

Der–Dev
 Der(22)t(8;22)(q24.1;q11.1) syndrome
 Dercum's disease aka Adiposis dolorosa
 Der Kaloustian–Jarudi–Khoury syndrome
 Der Kaloustian–Mcintosh–Silver syndrome
 Dermal dysplasia
 Dermatitis herpetiformis
 Dermatocardioskeletal syndrome Boronne type
 Dermatographic urticaria
 Dermatofibroma
 Dermatoleukodystrophy
 Dermatomyositis
 Dermatoosteolysis, Kirghizian type
 Dermatopathia pigmentosa reticularis
 Dermatophytids
 Dermatophytosis
 Dermochondrocorneal dystrophy of François
 Dermoodontodysplasia
 Desbuquois syndrome
 Desmin-related myofibrillar myopathy
 Desmoid disease
 Desmoid tumor
 Desmoplastic small round cell tumor
 Developmental coordination disorder
 Developmental delay epilepsy neonatal diabetes (DEND syndrome)
 Developmental delay hypotonia extremities hypertrophy
  Developmental dyslexia
 Developmental dysphasia familial
 Devic syndrome
 Devriendt–Legius–Fryns syndrome
 Devriendt–Vandenberghe–Fryns syndrome

Dex
 Dexamethasone sensitive hypertension
 Dextrocardia with situs inversus
 Dextrocardia
 Dextrocardia-bronchiectasis-sinusitis

Dg
 D-glycerate dehydrogenase deficiency
 D-Glyceric acidemia

Di

Dia

Diab–Diam
 Diabetes hypogonadism deafness mental retardation
 Diabetes insipidus
 Diabetes insipidus, diabetes mellitus, optic atrophy
 Diabetes insipidus, nephrogenic type 1
 Diabetes insipidus, nephrogenic type 2
 Diabetes insipidus, nephrogenic type 3
 Diabetes insipidus, nephrogenic, dominant type
 Diabetes insipidus, nephrogenic, recessive type
 Diabetes mellitus
 Diabetes mellitus type 1
 Diabetes mellitus type 2
 Diabetes persistent mullerian ducts
 Diabetes, insulin dependent
 Diabetic angiopathy
 Diabetic embryopathy
 Diabetic nephropathy
 Diabetic neuropathy
 Diamond–Blackfan anemia

Diap–Dias
 Diaphragmatic agenesia
 Diaphragmatic agenesis radial aplasia omphalocele
 Diaphragmatic defect limb deficiency skull defect
 Diaphragmatic hernia abnormal face limb
 Diaphragmatic hernia exomphalos corpus callosum agenesis
 Diaphragmatic hernia upper limb defects
 Diaphragmatic hernia, congenital
 Diarrhea chronic with villous atrophy
 Diarrhea polyendocrinopathy infections X linked
 Diastematomyelia
 Diastrophic dysplasia

Dib–Din
 Dibasic aminoaciduria 2
 Dibasic aminoaciduria type 1
 Dicarboxylicaminoaciduria
 Die Smulders–Droog–Van Dijk syndrome
 Die Smulders–Vles–Fryns syndrome
 Diencephalic syndrome
 Dieterich's disease
 Diethylstilbestrol antenatal infection
 Diffuse idiopathic skeletal hyperostosis
 Diffuse leiomyomatosis with Alport syndrome
 Diffuse neonatal hemangiomatosis
 Diffuse palmoplantar keratoderma, Bothnian type
 Diffuse panbronchiolitis
 Diffuse parenchymal lung disease
 DiGeorge syndrome
 Digestive duplication
 Digitorenocerebral syndrome
 Digoxin toxicity
 Dihydropteridine reductase deficiency
 Dihydropyrimidine dehydrogenase deficiency
 Dilated cardiomyopathy
 Dimitri–Sturge–Weber syndrome
 Dincsoy–Salih–Patel syndrome
 Dinno–Shearer–Weisskopf syndrome

Dio–Dip
 Diomedi–Bernardi–Placidi syndrome
 Dionisi–Vici–Sabetta–Gambarara syndrome
 Diphallia
 Diphallus rachischisis imperforate anus
 Diphosphoglycerate mutase deficiency of erythrocyte
 Diphtheria
 Diplopia
 Diplopia, binocular
 Diplopia, monocular

Dis–Div
 Disaccharide intolerance iii
 Discoid lupus erythematosus
 Disinhibited attachment disorder
 Dislocation of the hip dysmorphism
 Disorder in the hormonal synthesis with or without goiter
 Disorganization syndrome
 Dissecting cellulitis of the scalp
 Dissociative amnesia
 Dissociative hysteria
 Dissociative fugue
 Dissociative identity disorder
 Distal arthrogryposis Moore–Weaver type
 Distal myopathy Markesbery–Griggs type
 Distal myopathy with vocal cord weakness
 Distal myopathy, Nonaka type
 Distal myopathy
 Distal primary acidosis, familial
 Distemper
 Distichiasis heart congenital anomalies
 Distomatosis
 Diverticulitis
 Diverticulosis

Dk–Do
 Dk phocomelia syndrome
 D-minus hemolytic uremic syndrome
 Dobrow syndrome
 Dominant cleft palate
 Dominant ichthyosis vulgaris
 Dominant zonular cataract
 Donnai Barrow syndrome
 DOOR syndrome
 Dopamine beta hydroxylase deficiency
 DOPA-responsive dystonia
 Double cortex
 Double discordia
 Double fingernail of fifth finger
 Double outlet left ventricle
 Double outlet right ventricle
 Double tachycardia induced by catecholamines
 Double uterus-hemivagina-renal agenesis
 Down syndrome
 Doxorubicin-induced cardiomyopathy
 Doyne honeycomb retinal dystrophy

Dp–Du
 D-plus hemolytic uremic syndrome
 Drachtman–Weinblatt–Sitarz syndrome
 Dracunculiasis
 Duane anomaly mental retardation
 Duane syndrome
 Dubin–Johnson syndrome
 Dubowitz syndrome
 Duchenne muscular dystrophy
 Duhring–Brocq disease
 Duhring's disease
 Duker–Weiss–Siber syndrome
 Duodenal atresia tetralogy of Fallot
 Duodenal atresia
 Duplication of leg mirror foot
 Duplication of the thumb unilateral biphalangeal
 Duplication of urethra
 Dupont–Sellier–Chochillon syndrome
 Dupuytren subungual exostosis
 Dupuytren's contracture
 Dust-induced lung disease

Dw
 Dwarfism
 Dwarfism bluish sclerae
 Dwarfism deafness retinitis pigmentosa
 Dwarfism lethal type advanced bone age
 Dwarfism mental retardation eye abnormality
 Dwarfism short limb absent fibulas very short digits
 Dwarfism stiff joint ocular abnormalities
 Dwarfism syndesmodysplasic
 Dwarfism tall vertebrae
 Dwarfism thanatophoric
 Dwarfism thin bones multiple fractures

Dy

Dyg–Dyk
 Dyggve–Melchior–Clausen syndrome
 Dykes–Markes–Harper syndrome

Dys

Dysa–Dysk
 Dysautonomia
 Dysbarism
 Dyscalculia
 Dyschondrosteosis nephritis
 Dyschromatosis universalis
 Dysencephalia splachnocystica or Meckel–Gruber
 Dysequilibrium syndrome
 Dyserythropoietic anemia, congenital
 Dyserythropoietic anemia, congenital type 1
 Dyserythropoietic anemia, congenital type 2
 Dyserythropoietic anemia, congenital type 3
 Dysexecutive syndrome
 Dysferlinopathy
 Dysfibrinogenemia, familial
 Dysfibrinogenemia, acquired
 Dysgerminoma
 Dysgraphia
 Dysharmonic skeletal maturation muscular fiber disproportion
 Dyskeratosis congenita of Zinsser–Cole–Engman
 Dyskeratosis congenita
 Dyskeratosis follicularis
 Dyskinesia, drug induced
 Dyskinesia

Dysm–Dyss
 Dysmorphism abnormal vocalization mental retardation
 Dysmorphism cleft palate loose skin
 Dysmorphophobia
 Dysmyelination
 Dysosteosclerosis
 Dysostosis acral with facial and genital abnormalities
 Dysostosis peripheral
 Dysostosis Stanescu type
 Dysostosis
 Dyspareunia
 Dysphasic dementia, hereditary
 Dysphonia, chronic spasmodic
 Dysplasia epiphysealis hemimelica
 Dysplasia
 Dysplastic cortical hyperostosis
 Dysplastic nevus syndrome
 Dysprothrombinemia
 Dysraphism cleft lip palate limb reduction defects
 Dyssegmental dysplasia glaucoma
 Dyssegmental dysplasia Silverman–Handmaker type

Dyst
 Dysthymia
 Dystonia musculorum deformans
 Dystonia musculorum deformans type 1
 Dystonia musculorum deformans type 2
 Dystonia progressive with diurnal variation
 Dystonia
 Dystrophia myotonica
 Dystrophic epidermolysis bullosa
 Dystrophinopathy

D